The Ford GT75 is a diesel lawn tractor manufactured by Ford. a 48-inch mowing deck, and is belt-driven with six rotating blades.

External links
Ford FT 75 (TractorData.com)

GT75
Lawn and garden tractors